The 2023 Stanford Cardinal men's volleyball team represents Stanford University in the 2023 NCAA Division I & II men's volleyball season. The Cardinal, led by seventeenth year head coach John Kosty, play their home games split between Burnham Pavilion & Ford Center and Maples Pavilion. The Cardinal are members of the MPSF and were picked to finish third in the MPSF preseason poll.

Season highlights
Will be filled in as the season progresses.

Roster

Schedule
TV/Internet Streaming information:
All home games will be televised on Pac-12 Network or streamed on Pac-12+ Stanford's streaming page. Most road games will also be streamed by the schools streaming service. The conference tournament will be streamed by FloVolleyball.

{| class="wikitable sortable" style="width:90%"
|-
! style="" scope="col"|DateTime
! style="" scope="col"|Opponent
! style="" scope="col"| Rank(Tournament Seed)
! style="" scope="col"|ArenaCity(Tournament)
! style="" scope="col"|Television
! style="" scope="col"|Score
! style="" scope="col"|Attendance
! style="" scope="col"|Record(MPSF Record)
|- align="center" bgcolor="#ccffcc"
|1/67 p.m.
|St. Francis 
|#9
|Maples PavilionStanford, CA
|P12+ STAN
|W 3–1(25–16, 25–16, 21–25, 25–22)
|306
|1–0
|- align="center" bgcolor="#ccffcc"
|1/75 p.m.
|St. Francis
|#9
|Maples PavilionStanford, CA
|P12+ STAN
|W 3–2 (25–18, 23–25, 23–25, 25–21, 15–13)
|404
|2–0
|- align="center" bgcolor="#ccffcc"
|1/137 p.m.
|#10 UC Santa Barbara
|#8
|Burnham Pavilion & Ford CenterStanford, CA
|P12+ STAN
|W 3–0(25–16, 26-24, 25–18)
|596
|3-0
|- align="center" bgcolor="#ccffcc"
|1/145 p.m.
|#10 UC Santa Barbara
|#8
|Burham Pavilion & Ford CenterStanford, CA
|P12+ STAN
|W 3–2(20-25, 25-22, 24–26, 26-24, 15-12)
|585
|4-0
|- align="center" bgcolor="#ccffcc"
|1/205 p.m.
|vs. #15 Lewis
|#8
|Austin Convention CenterAustin, TX(First Point Men's Volleyball Collegiate Challenge)
|Volleyball World TV
|W 3–1(24-26, 25-23, 25–20, 25-22)
|1,234
|5-0
|- align="center" bgcolor="#ffbbb"
|1/215 p.m.
|vs. #4 Penn State
|#8
|Austin Convention CenterAustin, TX(First Point Men's Volleyball Collegiate Challenge)
|Volleyball World TV
|L 1-3(18-25, 17-25, 25–20, 23-25)
|1,404
|5-1
|- align="center" bgcolor="#ccffcc"
|1/286 p.m.
|@ UC Santa Cruz
|#7
|Kaiser Permanente ArenaSanta Cruz, CA
|YouTube
|W 3–0(25-21, 25-22, 25–20)
|388
|6-1
|- align="center" bgcolor="#ffbbb"
|2/35 p.m.
|@ CSUN
|#6
|Premier America Credit Union ArenaNorthridge, CA
|ESPN+
|L 2-3(25-21, 24-26, 25–22, 18-25, 13-15)
|425
|6-2
|- align="center" bgcolor="#ccffcc"
|2/41 p.m.
|@ The Master's
|#6
|The MacArthur CenterSanta Clarita, CA
|GSAC SN
|W 3–0(25-23, 25-21, 25–18)
|0
|7-2
|- align="center" bgcolor="#ffbbb"
|2/107 p.m.
|#1 Hawai'i
|#8
|Burnham Pavilion & Ford CenterStanford, CA
|P12+ STAN
|L 0-3(22-25, 19-25, 24-26)
|1,703
|7-3
|- align="center" bgcolor="#ffbbb"
|2/116 p.m.
|#1 Hawai'i
|#8
|Burnham Pavilion & Ford CenterStanford, CA
|P12+ STAN
|L 0-3(25-27, 19-25, 19-25)
|1,336
|7-4
|- align="center" bgcolor="#ffbbb"
|2/177 p.m.
|#7 Pepperdine*
|#9
|Burnham Pavilion & Ford CenterStanford, CA
|P12+ STAN
|L 0-3(19-25, 16-25, 22-25)
|532
|7-5(0-1)
|- align="center" bgcolor="#ccffcc"
|2/185 p.m.
|#7 Pepperdine*
|#9
|Maples PavilionStanford, CA
|P12 BAY
|W 3-2(20-25, 25-20, 25-17, 23-25, 15-12)
|868
|8-5(1-1)
|- align="center" bgcolor="#ccffcc"
|2/247 p.m.
|@ #13 USC*
|#9
|Galen CenterLos Angeles, CA
|P12 LA
|W 3-1(25-22, 24-26, 25-16, 25-20)
|392
|9-5(2-1)
|- align="center" bgcolor="#ffbbb"
|2/264 p.m.
|@ #13 USC*
|#9
|Galen CenterLos Angeles, CA
|P12, P12 LA
|L 2-3(19-25, 25-18, 24-26, 25-22, 15-17)
|559
|9-6(2-2)
|- align="center" bgcolor="#ffbbb"
|3/35 p.m.
|#14 CSUN
|#10
|Maples PavilionStanford, CA
|P12+ STAN
|L 0-3'''(20-25, 23-25, 24-26)
|436
|9-7
|- align="center"  bgcolor="#ffbbb"
|3/43 p.m.
|#6 UC Irvine
|#10
|Maples PavilionStanford, CA
|P12+ STAN
|L 0-3(17-25, 23-25, 22-25)
|793
|9-8
|- align="center" bgcolor="#ffbbb"
|3/177 p.m.
|#3 UCLA*
|#10
|Burnham Pavilion & Ford CenterStanford, CA
|P12+ STAN
|L 0-3'(12-25, 12-25, 12-25)
|839
|9-9(2-3)
|- align="center" bgcolor="#ffbbb"
|3/185 p.m.
|#3 UCLA*
|#10
|Burnham Pavilion & Ford CenterStanford, CA
|P12+ STAN
|L 0-3'(18-25, 21-25, 20-25)
|908
|9-10(2-4)
|- align="center"  
|3/317 p.m.
|Concordia Irvine*
|
|Maples PavilionStanford, CA
|P12+ STAN
|
|
|
|- align="center" 
|4/17 p.m.
|Concordia Irvine*
|
|Maples PavilionStanford, CA
|P12+ STAN
|
|
|
|- align="center" 
|4/77 p.m.
|Grand Canyon*
|
|Maples PavilionStanford, CA
|P12+ STAN
|
|
|
|- align="center" 
|4/86 p.m.
|Grand Canyon*
|
|Maples PavilionStanford, CA
|P12+ STAN
|
|
|
|- align="center" 
|4/146 p.m.
|@ BYU*
|
|Smith FieldhouseProvo, UT
|BYUtv
|
|
|
|- align="center"  
|4/156 p.m.
|@ BYU*
|
|Smith FieldhouseProvo, UT
|BYUtv
|
|
|
|- align="center" 
|4/19TBA
|
|
|Maples PavilionStanford, CA(MPSF Quarterfinal)
|FloVolleyball
|
|
|
|-
|}
 *-Indicates conference match.
 Times listed are Pacific Time Zone.

Announcers for televised games

St. Francis: Tim Swartz & Troy ClardySt. Francis: Tim Swartz & Jordan WatkinsUC Santa Barbara: Troy Clardy 
UC Santa Barbara: Ted EnbergLewis: Rob Espero & Bill Walton 
Penn State: Rob Espero & Bill Walton''
UC Santa Cruz: 
CSUN: 
The Master's: 
Hawai'i: 
Hawai'i: 
Pepperdine: 
Pepperdine: 
USC: 
USC: 
CSUN: 
UC Irvine: 
UCLA: 
UCLA: 
Concordia Irvine: 
Concordia Irvine: 
Grand Canyon: 
Grand Canyon: 
BYU: 
BYU: 
MPSF Quarterfinal:

Rankings 

^The Media did not release a Pre-season or Week 1 poll.

References

2023 in sports in California
2023 NCAA Division I & II men's volleyball season
Stanford